Bjarkøya is an island in Harstad Municipality in Troms og Finnmark county, Norway. The  island is located north of the island of Grytøya and northwest of the island of Sandsøya. The Andfjorden lies to the northwest and the Vågsfjorden lies to the southeast. The main church for the island is Bjarkøy Church in the village of Nergården. The island's population (2017) is 267.

The Bjarkøy Tunnel connects the village of Austnes on the southeastern tip of the island to the northeastern tip of the neighboring island of Grytøya. This tunnel is part of the Bjarkøy Fixed Link project that also has a bridge between the islands of Grytøya to Sandsøya. The tunnel and bridge project will open in late 2018.

History
Bjarkøya was the main island of the former municipality of Bjarkøy which existed until 2013 when it merged with Harstad Municipality. The administrative centre of Bjarkøy municipality was the village of Nergården, located on the island.

See also
List of islands of Norway

References

Harstad
Islands of Troms og Finnmark